ICAI is the acronym of Institute of Chartered Accountants of India, the national professional accounting body of India.

ICAI may also refer to:

 Independent Commission for Aid Impact, a British public body asked with the scrutiny of UK foreign aid
 ICAI School of Engineering, school of engineering located in Madrid, Spain
 Innovation Center for Artificial Intelligence, a Dutch network in the area of artificial intelligence